Fluticasone is a manufactured glucocorticoid used to treat nasal symptoms. Both the esters, fluticasone propionate (a brand name for which is Flovent) and fluticasone furoate, are also used as topical anti-inflammatories and inhaled corticosteroids, and are used much more commonly in comparison.

It is on the World Health Organization's List of Essential Medicines. In 2020, it was the 23rd most commonly prescribed medication in the United States, with more than 24million prescriptions, although it is also sold over the counter.

See also 
 Fluticasone furoate
 Fluticasone furoate/vilanterol
 Fluticasone propionate
 Fluticasone/salmeterol

References

External links 
 

Antiasthmatic drugs
Diketones
Diols
Drugs acting on the respiratory system
Fluoroarenes
GSK plc brands
Glucocorticoids
Pregnanes
Respiratory therapy
Thioethers